The Mill Hill Missionaries (MHM), officially known as the Saint Joseph's Missionary Society of Mill Hill, is a Catholic society of apostolic life founded in 1866 by Herbert Alfred Vaughan, MHM.

History

It was founded in 1866 by Herbert Alfred Vaughan. In 1892, it branched to create a separate North American offshoot, the Society of Saint Joseph of the Sacred Heart (Josephites).

The society was formerly based at St Joseph's College at Mill Hill in north London. The late 1960s saw the development of the Missionary Institute of London, to consolidate training facilities for the various mission societies in Britain. St Joseph's College site was closed in 2006. Its present headquarters are at 6 Colby Gardens in Maidenhead, Berkshire SL6 7GZ.

In 1884 St Peter's School, Freshfield, near Liverpool was founded to serve as a preparatory school to the college.

During the Second World War the college was evacuated to Lochwinnoch in Scotland.  The war ministry then requisitioned part of the buildings for the use of the civil service.  So, the college at Mill Hill was effectively closed for the duration of the war. In the 1960s, Pope John XXIII asked missionary societies to become involved in South America. As of 2019, the Mill Hill Missionaries are active in Brazil and Ecuador.

On its 150th anniversary, an account of its history on the Diocese of Westminster website said in part: "At the 1988 Chapter, with representatives from all over the Mill Hill world present, a decision was taken to recruit Mill Hill Missionaries from Africa and Asia, our former mission areas, now flourishing with well-established churches planted and grown by Mill Hill Missionaries." There are now Mill Hill Society formation centres in Cameroon, East Africa, Philippines and India.

As of 2014, the congregation has forty priests working within Ireland, and twenty working internationally, with an average age of 73.

Superiors general
 Herbert Cardinal Vaughan (1868 – 19 June 1903), founder

 Jac Hetsen, Netherlands (1 January 2000 – July 2005) 
 Anthony Chantry, England (UK) (July 2005 – 15 June 2015)  
 Michael Corcoran, Ireland  (15 June 2015 – present)

Prelates from their ranks
 Colin Cameron Davies, Bishop Emeritus, Diocese of Ngong, Kenya 
 Cornelius Schilder, Bishop Emeritus of Ngong, Kenya
 Ignatius Arnoz

See also
 Alice Ingham, who founded the Franciscan order of Sisters of St. Joseph's Society for Foreign Missions

References

External links

 Catholic Encyclopedia article
 Vocationsireland.com

Religious organizations established in 1866
1866 establishments in England